Dabney is an unincorporated community in Vance County, North Carolina, United States. There was a post office in Dabney from December 3, 1883 to March 15, 1935. The first postmaster was John Eaton Burroughs. Dabney is in the Township of Dabney.

References

Unincorporated communities in Vance County, North Carolina
Unincorporated communities in North Carolina